Hypercompe lemairei is a moth of the family Erebidae first described by Watson and Goodger in 1986. It is found in Colombia.

References

Hypercompe
Moths described in 1986